Kings Polytechnic is a private polytechnic in Ubiaja, Nigeria.

History 
It is an offspring of the new Era Institute of Technology, Ubiaja, which was established in 2005. The desire for the change from an institute to a polytechnic was a result of the foresight of the proprietor, Chief Sir Francis Anegbode Ijewere, a retired chief of banking operations of the Central Bank of Nigeria. He saw in a polytechnic greater opportunity in the areas of technology and skills acquisition than an institute, especially in the sidelined zone, like Esan South East local government area of Edo State, in opportunities for tertiary education.

Pursuant to this change, he followed the due process of establishing a private polytechnic, by applying to the National Board for Technical Education, the statutory body set up by the Federal Government to manage and control all matters relating to polytechnic education in Nigeria. In response to the application, the NBTE gave him a printed document on "Guidelines and Procedure for the Establishment of Private Polytechnics, Monotechnics and Similar Tertiary Institutions in Nigeria".

Following the guidelines, the proprietor put in place a temporary site. He obtained all the needed resources (structures, equipment, and staffs both academic and non-academic), and acquired over 50 hectares of land for the permanent site. He thereafter invited the NBTE for advisory/approval invitation, which took place in April 2007.

The polytechnic was given approval by the Hon. Minister of Education, to commence business with effect from January 29, 2010.

Courses 
The institution offers the following courses;

 Accountancy
Architectural Technology
Building Technology
 Business Administration and Management
 Agricultural Engineering/Technology
 Electrical/Electronics Engineering
Estate Management
 Mass Communication
Quantity Surveying
 Science Laboratory Technology

See also 
 List of Polytechnics in Nigeria

References

External links 
https://kingspolytechnic.com/

Education in Edo State
Private schools in Nigeria
Universities and colleges in Nigeria
Educational institutions established in 2010
2010 establishments in Nigeria